Leterrius "L.T." Deon Walton (born March 31, 1992) is a former American football defensive tackle. He played college football at Central Michigan and was drafted by the Pittsburgh Steelers in the sixth round of the 2015 NFL Draft.

College career
In his career at Central Michigan, Walton played in 54 games with 30 starts.

Professional career
Coming out of college, Walton was projected by many analysts to be selected in the fifth or sixth round. He was ranked the 17th-best defensive tackle out of the 177 available by NFLDraftScout.com. Walton was invited to the NFL Combine and completed all the required workouts and positional drills. He was satisfied enough with his combine numbers that he only participated in positional drills at Central Michigan's Pro Day. Analysts gave him positive reviews for his large frame, athletic ability, and quick hands, and called him a disciplined pass rusher with an explosive first step that can penetrate the line. He was also criticized for his technique, limited pass rush, and inconsistent ability to finish and get to tackles.

Pittsburgh Steelers
The Pittsburgh Steelers selected Walton in the sixth round (199th overall) of the 2015 NFL Draft.

On May 8, 2015, the Steelers signed him to a four-year, $2.39 million contract with $116,928 guaranteed. On August 5, 2015, he made the Steelers' active 53-man roster. He began his rookie regular season as the backup right defensive end to Cameron Heyward. He made his regular season debut on September 27, 2015, in a Week 3 victory over the St. Louis Rams.

During his rookie season of 2015, he played in six games without recording any statistics.

Walton began his second season as the Steelers' fourth defensive end on the depth chart behind Heyward, Tuitt, and Ricardo Mathews. On December 11, 2016, he earned his first career start after Heyward was lost for the season due to injury. In the 27–20 victory over the Buffalo Bills he recorded his first career tackle and finished the game with two combined tackles.

He was named the backup left defensive end behind Cameron Heyward to begin the regular season. During the Pittsburgh Steelers' 21–18 season-opening victory over the Cleveland Browns, he recorded one tackle.

Buffalo Bills
On June 5, 2019, Walton signed with the Buffalo Bills. He was released on August 31, 2019.

Pittsburgh Steelers (second stint)
On October 10, 2019, Walton re-signed with the Pittsburgh Steelers following an injury to Stephon Tuitt. He was placed on injured reserve on November 19, 2019.

References

External links
Central Michigan Chippewas bio
Pro-Football reference

1992 births
Living people
People from Clinton, Macomb County, Michigan
Sportspeople from Metro Detroit
Players of American football from Michigan
American football defensive tackles
Central Michigan Chippewas football players
Pittsburgh Steelers players
Buffalo Bills players